The Tybee Island mid-air collision was an incident on February 5, 1958, in which the United States Air Force lost a  Mark 15 nuclear bomb in the waters off Tybee Island near Savannah, Georgia, United States. During a practice exercise, an F-86 fighter plane collided with the B-47 bomber carrying the bomb. To protect the aircrew from a possible detonation in the event of a crash, the bomb was jettisoned. Following several unsuccessful searches, the bomb was presumed lost somewhere in Wassaw Sound off the shores of Tybee Island.

Midair collision 

The B-47 bomber was on a simulated combat mission from Homestead Air Force Base in Florida. It was carrying a single  bomb. At about 2:00 a.m., an F-86 fighter collided with the B-47. The F-86 crashed after the pilot ejected from the plane. The damaged B-47 remained airborne, plummeting  from  when the pilot, Colonel Howard Richardson, regained flight control.

The crew requested permission to jettison the bomb, in order to reduce weight and prevent the bomb from exploding during an emergency landing. The crew did not see an explosion when the bomb struck the sea. They managed to land the B-47 safely at the nearest base, Hunter Air Force Base. Colonel Richardson was awarded the Distinguished Flying Cross after this incident.

The bomb 
Some sources describe the bomb as a functional nuclear weapon, but others describe it as disabled. If it had a plutonium nuclear core installed, it was a fully functional weapon. If it had a dummy core installed, it was incapable of producing a nuclear explosion but could still produce a conventional explosion. The 12-foot (4 m) long Mark 15 bomb weighs  and bears the serial number 47782. It contains  of conventional high explosives and highly enriched uranium. The Air Force maintains that its "nuclear capsule" (physics package), used to initiate the nuclear reaction, was removed before its flight aboard the B-47. As noted in the Atomic Energy Commission "Form AL-569 Temporary Custodian Receipt (for maneuvers)", signed by the aircraft commander, the bomb contained a simulated  cap made of lead. However, according to 1966 Congressional testimony by Assistant Secretary of Defense W.J. Howard, the Tybee Island bomb was a "complete weapon, a bomb with a nuclear capsule" and one of two weapons lost that contained a plutonium trigger. Nevertheless, a study of the Strategic Air Command documents indicates that Alert Force test flights in February 1958 with the older Mark 15 payloads were not authorized to fly with nuclear capsules on board. Such approval was pending deployment of safer "sealed-pit nuclear capsule" weapons, which did not begin deployment until June 1958.

Recovery efforts 
Starting on February 6, 1958, the Air Force 2700th Explosive Ordnance Disposal Squadron and 100 Navy personnel equipped with hand-held sonar and galvanic drag and cable sweeps mounted a search. On April 16, the military announced the search had been unsuccessful. Based on a hydrographic survey in 2001, the bomb was thought by the Department of Energy to lie buried under  of silt at the bottom of Wassaw Sound.

In 2004, retired Air Force Lt. Colonel Derek Duke claimed to have narrowed the possible resting spot of the bomb down to a small area approximately the size of a football field. He and his partner located the area by trawling in their boat with a Geiger counter in tow. Secondary radioactive particles four times naturally occurring levels were detected and mapped, and the site of radiation origination triangulated. An Air Force nuclear weapons adviser speculated that the source of the radiation was natural, originating from monazite deposits.

Ongoing concerns 
As of 2007, no undue levels of unnatural radioactive contamination have been detected in the regional Upper Floridan aquifer by the Georgia Department of Natural Resources (over and above the already high levels thought to be due to monazite, a locally occurring mineral that is naturally radioactive).

In popular culture
In February 2015, a fake news web site ran an article stating that the bomb was found by vacationing Canadian divers and that the bomb had since been removed from the bay. The fake story spread widely via social media.

The MonsterVerse graphic novel Godzilla Dominion has the Titan Scylla find the sunken warhead off the coast of Savannah, Georgia, having sensed its radiation as a potential food source, only for Godzilla and the US Coast Guard to drive her into a retreat and safely recover the bomb.

See also
 Broken Arrow
 List of military nuclear accidents

Notes

References 

 
 
 
 
 
 Michael H. Maggelet and James C. Oskins (2008). "Broken Arrow: The Declassified History of U.S. Nuclear Weapons Accidents". Lulu. .

External links

 America's Lost H Bomb, Marabella Productions & Discovery's Science Channel documentary about the Tybee Bomb (2007)
 NPR, For 50 Years, Nuclear Bomb Lost in Watery Grave (February 3, 2008)
 BBC News, Missing for 50 years – US nuclear bomb (June 22, 2009)
 The Nuclear Information Project, Nuclear Bomb Dropped in Georgia; No Nuclear Capsule Inserted, Documents Show (2004)
 Strategic-Air-Command.com, Chart of nuclear bombs, including the Mark 15
 Chasing Loose Nukes  by Col. Derek Duke (as told to Fred Dungan)
 Broken Arrow, BBC audio programme on the Tybee Bomb, streaming audio

1958 in Georgia (U.S. state)
1958 in military history
February 1958 events in the United States
Chatham County, Georgia
Military nuclear accidents and incidents
Mid-air collisions
Mid-air collisions involving military aircraft
History of Georgia (U.S. state)
Aviation accidents and incidents in the United States in 1958
Aviation accidents and incidents in Georgia (U.S. state)
Accidents and incidents involving United States Air Force aircraft
Nuclear accidents and incidents in the United States